The Newberg Graphic is the weekly newspaper of Newberg, Oregon, United States. In January 2013, the paper was sold to the Pamplin Media Group along with five other papers owned by Eagle Newspapers.

See also
 List of newspapers in Oregon

References

Newberg, Oregon
1907 establishments in Oregon
Newspapers published by Pamplin Media Group
Oregon Newspaper Publishers Association
Publications established in 1907